Operation Caban was a bloodless military operation by France in September 1979 to depose Emperor Bokassa I, reinstate the exiled former president David Dacko, and rename the Central African Empire back to Central African Republic.

History

By January 1979, Emperor Bokassa had become a widely resented autocrat. His fall was precipitated by a decree that all high school students must buy uniforms from a business owned by one of his wives. This led to protests by students in Bangui and rocks thrown at the Emperor's car. In April 1979, Bokassa called in the Central African Armed Forces to put down the agitation and arrest the teenage students. In the following two days, about 100 children were brutally killed and the incident became known as the "children's massacre at Bangui." 

A panel of judges convened and proposed to arrest and try Bokassa for the massacre. Bokassa then fled to Libya, seeking Muammar Gaddafi's assistance. The French reacted and soon launched Operation Barracuda to overthrow Bokassa and install David Dacko, who was then in exile in Europe. French troops arrived from Gabon and Chad, and the coup was successful, restoring Dacko to the presidency after a 13-year absence, and restored the Central African Republic (CAR). Bokassa was given refuge in France.

Bokassa eventually returned to the CAR in 1987, where he was immediately arrested  and sentenced to death, commuted to life in prison a year later. As one of his last acts in office in 1993, President André Kolingba granted a general amnesty for all prisoners, including Bokassa, who died three years later.

The coup was known as Operation Caban, while the movement of four French paratrooper troupes de marine and four helicopters was Operation Barracuda. The coup was completed on 21 September 1979 in just a few hours. The affair did not bring accolades to France: while many in CAR supported the coup, many in France including President Giscard-d'Estaing were criticised for their handling of the situation.

Footnotes

1979 in the Central African Republic
Central African Republic–France relations
Military operations involving France
Conflicts in 1979